The Wannian Bridge is a stone arch bridge built over the Xu River in 1647 at the dawn of the Qing dynasty (1644–1911). It is located in Nancheng County, Jiangxi, China. It is adjacent to the Juxing Pagoda.

History
Construction of the Wannian Bridge, commenced in 1635 and was completed in 1647, which took 12 years. During the Qing dynasty (1644–1911), it underwent three renovations, respectively in the ruling of Yongzheng Emperor (1724) and in the reign of Qianlong Emperor and in 1887 in the 13th year of Guangxu era.

In March 2013, it was listed among the seventh batch of "Major National Historical and Cultural Sites in Jiangxi" by the State Council of China.

Architecture
It has 23 holes and 24 piers.

References

Bridges in Jiangxi
Arch bridges in China
Bridges completed in 1647
Qing dynasty architecture
Buildings and structures completed in 1647
Major National Historical and Cultural Sites in Jiangxi
1647 establishments in China